The Leader of the Opposition in Southern Rhodesia and Rhodesia was a title held by the leader of the largest political party in the most important house of the legislature that was not in government. 

This was the unicameral Legislative Assembly from 1924 to 1970 and the House of Assembly of the bicameral Parliament from 1970 to 1979. They acted as the public face of the opposition, leading the Shadow Cabinet and the challenge to the government on the floor of the legislature. They thus acted as a chief critic of the government and ultimately attempt to portray the opposition as a feasible alternate government.

List of leaders of the opposition in Rhodesia (1924–1979)

Notes

References
 European Politics in Southern Rhodesia, by Colin Leys (1959, Oxford University Press)
 Rhodesia: The Road to Rebellion, by James Barber (1967, Oxford University Press)
 White Working Class Disunity: the Southern Rhodesia Labour Party, by M. C. Steele (1st volume 1970, Rhodesian History; article in historical journal, particularly useful in explaining the situation in the 1940–45 period)
 Some Recollections of a Rhodesian Speaker, by Hon. A.R.W. Stumbles (1980, Books of Rhodesia)

Politics of Rhodesia
Leaders of the Opposition
Rhodesia